Ned Ludd was a restaurant in Portland, Oregon's King neighborhood, in the United States. Established in 2008, the restaurant was owned by chef Jason French. It served Pacific Northwest cuisine.

Ned Ludd closed during the COVID-19 pandemic. The space is now occupied by pizzeria Cafe Olli.

See also 

 COVID-19 pandemic in Portland, Oregon
 Impact of the COVID-19 pandemic on the restaurant industry in the United States
 List of defunct restaurants of the United States
 List of Pacific Northwest restaurants

References

External links

 
 Ned Ludd at the Food Network
 Ned Ludd at Thrillist

2008 establishments in Oregon
Defunct Pacific Northwest restaurants
Defunct restaurants in Portland, Oregon
King, Portland, Oregon
Restaurants disestablished during the COVID-19 pandemic
Restaurants established in 2008
Pacific Northwest restaurants in Oregon